Ernest Sefton (born as Ernest Henry Tipton; 13 January 1883 in Hackney, London – 5 December 1954) was a British film actor. He was the brother of Violet Loraine.

Selected filmography
 The Sign of Four (1932)
 The Innocents of Chicago (1932)
 The Bermondsey Kid (1933)
 Radio Parade (1933)
 Enemy of the Police (1933)
 Strike It Rich (1933)
 Little Miss Nobody (1933)
 Britannia of Billingsgate (1933)
 Great Stuff (1933)
 Double Wedding (1933)
 I'll Stick to You (1933)
 Murder at Monte Carlo (1934)
 The Third Clue (1934)
 What's in a Name? (1934)
 Big Business (1934)
 No Limit (1935)
 Hello, Sweetheart (1935)
 Say It with Diamonds (1935)
 Look Up and Laugh (1935)
 Strictly Illegal (1935)
 It's in the Bag (1936)
 Cheer Up (1936)
 Wolf's Clothing (1936)
 Double Alibi (1937)
 Millions (1937)
 The Great Barrier (1937)
 The Fatal Hour  (1937)
 I See Ice (1938)
 The Body Vanished (1939)
 That's the Ticket (1940)
 The Grand Escapade (1946)
 Here Comes the Sun (1946)

References

External links
 

1883 births
1954 deaths
English male film actors
People from Hackney Central
20th-century English male actors